Pleasure is a 2021 erotic drama film written and directed by Ninja Thyberg in her feature directorial debut. The film is based on Thyberg's 2013 short of the same name, and is about a young woman from a small Swedish town who moves to Los Angeles to become a porn star. It stars Sofia Kappel, Revika Anne Reustle, Evelyn Claire, Chris Cock, Dana DeArmond and Kendra Spade.

Pleasure was selected for the 2020 Cannes Film Festival before premiering at the 2021 Sundance Film Festival on 1 February 2021 in the World Cinema Dramatic Competition section.

Plot
19-year-old Linnéa, working under the stage name "Bella Cherry", is a naive, confident girl from a small town in Sweden who travels to Los Angeles in the hopes of becoming the next big porn star. Under the guidance of her manager, she begins to navigate the challenging world of the porn industry and is determined to land more significant roles and video views by pushing herself to ignore personal boundaries and limits. Bella shares a house with a group of other young actresses attempting to become famous, and though she is standoffish and private at first, she eventually bonds with one of her housemates, Joy, who supports her and helps Bella build her brand. At a party, the girls spot Mark Spiegler, one of the most successful and demanding agents in the porn industry; he is joined by Ava, one of the biggest names in the local porn scene. Bella attempts to start a conversation with Ava, who ignores her. Joy tries to flirt with a famous male actor, Caesar, but when he cruelly rejects her, she retaliates by pushing him into the pool.

Bella works on several shoots, including a BDSM scene with a female director who encourages Bella in positive, healthy ways, enforcing safety and consent on the set. However, Bella is determined to push herself further, and she requests hardcore scenes from her manager. While filming a rape scene with two male actors, she becomes overwhelmed and breaks down, repeatedly interrupting filming. Initially, her co-stars and the director seem encouraging, but they quickly grow hostile and dismissive when she struggles to finish the scene. Bella reluctantly agrees to complete the shoot and later confronts her manager, who reminds her that she requested harder material. Upset, Bella fires him as her manager.

Now working independently, Bella attempts to acquire Spiegler as her new manager, but he turns her down, saying she has a weak social media following and insisting he only accepts actresses willing to do extreme scenes. In order to prove herself, Bella participates in an interracial threesome, which includes a first-ever "interracial, double anal penetration", boosting her following considerably. Spiegler is impressed and agrees to hire Bella. As a way to repay her friend, Bella requests that Joy be part of her next scene. Joy is initially thrilled, but hesitates when the lead actor withdraws at the last minute and is replaced by Caesar. Bella implores Joy to go through with the shoot, but soon observes Caesar harassing Joy off-camera. During the scene, which involves degradation and humiliation, Caesar begins to legitimately abuse Joy, who stops the scene in anger. Joy insists to the director that Caesar is harming her, but when she asks Bella to confirm Caesar's earlier harassment, Bella, worried about her reputation, balks. Furious, Joy upbraids Bella for her betrayal and storms off the set.

Bella is given a chance to film a scene with Ava, but Ava humiliates her when she refuses to perform oral sex on Bella, claiming she has a yeast infection. The scene is changed so that Bella will penetrate Ava with a strap-on, but Bella quickly lets her anger and frustration take over, acting violently and aggressively towards Ava without warning or consent, just as many of her male co-stars and directors did to her since her arrival. When Bella tries to apologize to Ava later en route to a party, Ava nonchalantly dismisses her as if nothing had bothered her, which disturbs Bella. Bella is further disillusioned when she spots her old housemates at the party, all of whom are enjoying their time at the party opposite of Bella who is essentially now locked in the VIP area. On the ride back from the party, Bella abruptly asks the car to stop so that she can get out.

Cast

Release
Pleasure was selected for the 2020 Cannes Film Festival before premiering at the 2021 Sundance Film Festival on 1 February 2021. On 8 February 2021, A24 acquired U.S. distribution rights to the film. However, on 7 October 2021, it was announced that Neon had acquired U.S. distribution rights to the film, reportedly due to conflicts over A24's plans to release an edited, R-rated theatrical cut in addition to an uncensored version; Neon stated it would not mandate any alternate edit. The film was screened at the 2021 AFI Fest in Los Angeles on 13 November. The film was given a limited theatrical release in the United States on 13 May 2022.

The film was released in Sweden on 8 October 2021 by SF Studios, in France on 20 October 2021 by The Jokers, and in the Netherlands on 4 November 2021 by Gusto Entertainment.

Reception
  At the 57th Guldbagge Awards, the film received seven nominations, including Best Film and Best Director for Thyberg, and won three, including Best Actress for Kappel. Other awards nominations the film has received include the 2021 British Independent Film Award for Best International Independent Film as well as Best Director for Thyberg and Best Supporting Female for Reustle at the 37th Independent Spirit Awards.

After the film's release, actors Lance Hart and Axel Braun both tweeted critically of the film, saying they felt "duped" and that the film was "a cheap shot making us look bad". Since then, however, Braun has expressed support for the film and was in attendance for its U.S. premiere.

References

External links
 

2021 films
2021 directorial debut films
2021 drama films
2021 independent films
2021 multilingual films
2020s English-language films
2020s erotic drama films
2020s French films
2020s Swedish-language films
Dutch erotic drama films
Dutch independent films
Dutch multilingual films
English-language Dutch films
English-language French films
English-language Swedish films
Features based on short films
Films about pornography
Films set in Los Angeles
French erotic drama films
French independent films
French multilingual films
Swedish erotic drama films
Swedish independent films
Swedish multilingual films